KIMY (93.9 FM) is a radio station licensed to Watonga, Oklahoma, United States. The station is currently owned by South Central Oklahoma Christian Broadcasting, Inc.

KIMY broadcasts a southern gospel format to the Oklahoma City, Oklahoma, area.

History
This station was assigned call sign KIMY on December 14, 1987.

References

External links
thegospelstation.com

IMY
Southern Gospel radio stations in the United States
Radio stations established in 1987
1987 establishments in Oklahoma